Erin Dolan is the Georgia Athletic Association Professor of Innovative Science Education at the University of Georgia. Dolan is a biochemist known for her research on engaging students in science research.

Education and career 
Dolan has a B.A. in biology from Wellesley College (1993) where she did an honors thesis on SCPb, a neurotransmitter in the American lobster. She earned a Ph.D. in neuroscience from the University of California, San Francisco where she worked on developmental plasticity in the nematode Caenorhabditis elegans. Following her Ph.D., she worked at the University of Arizona for two years before moving to Virginia Tech in 2002. In 2011, Dolan moved to the University of Georgia where she was named the Georgia Athletic Association Professor of Innovative Science Education in 2016. From 2014 until 2016 she was the executive director of the Texas Institute for Discovery Education in Science at the University of Texas at Austin.

In 2010 Dolan was named Editor-in-chief of the journal CBE: Life Sciences Education.

Research 
As a neuroscientist, Dolan worked on sensory signalling, gene expression, and nerve development in the nematode Caenorhabditis elegans. Following her graduate work, Dolan started researching science education where she focuses on the development of programs to increase retention of students in science disciplines and how social and cultural phenomena impact student learning and development, particularly in course-based undergraduate research experiences called CUREs.

Selected publications

Awards and honors 

 Bruce Alberts Award for Excellence in Science Education (2018)
 Award for Exemplary Contributions to Education, American Society for Biochemistry and Molecular Biology (2017)
 Excellence in Education of the American Society of Plant Biologists (2013)

References

External links 

 

University of California, San Francisco alumni
Wellesley College alumni
University of Georgia faculty
Living people
Women biochemists
Science teachers
American neuroscientists
1971 births